Gartmore Group Limited was a British-based investment management business. It was listed on the London Stock Exchange.

History 
The Company was founded in 1969 by British & Commonwealth and acquired by Banque Indosuez in 1989. It was first listed on the London Stock Exchange in 1996. It was then bought by NatWest in 1996 and by Nationwide Mutual Insurance Company in 2000 before becoming part of the investment portfolio of Hellman & Friedman, a private equity fund, in 2006. It was re-listed on the London Stock Exchange in December 2009.

Henderson Group announced its acquisition of the company in January 2011.

Operations
The Company had £22.2 billion of assets under management as at 31 December 2009.

References

External links 
 Official site

Companies listed on the London Stock Exchange
Financial services companies established in 1969
Financial services companies based in London
1969 establishments in England
Financial services companies disestablished in 2011
2011 disestablishments in England
2011 mergers and acquisitions
British companies disestablished in 2011
British companies established in 1969